Viddikalude Swargam (Fool's Paradise) is a Malayalam short story collection by Vaikom Muhammad Basheer published in 1948. The book is one of the best acknowledged works of Basheer and is considered a modern classic in Malayalam.

List of stories
"Viddikalude Swargam"
"Poovan Pazham"
"Nilavu Kaanumpol"
"Aadyathe Chumbanam"
"Kaalpadu"
"Ozhinha Veedu"

References

1948 short story collections
Short story collections by Vaikom Muhammad Basheer
Malayalam-language books
DC Books books
Malayalam short stories
Indian short story collections